The  La Redoute Stadium is a French Stadium on the island of Réunion, an overseas department in the south-western Indian Ocean.

It is located in Saint-Denis, the capital, on the small plateau hosting neighborhood of La Redoute.

History  
Frequented by neighborhood joggers, this sports ground welcomes every year the arrival of Grand Raid, a mountain race that crosses the island from the Sud Sauvage.  In the past, horse races, and races of donkeys and  pigs were organized there and were lively popular successes: the site supported a hippodrome now disappeared. it also had, for a time,  a velodrome at the beginning of 20th century.

References 

Athletics (track and field) venues in France
Sports venues in Réunion
Velodromes in France